Anthony Ewart Frank Cornwell (19 August 1929 – 26 August 2017) was an English cricketer.  Cornwell was a right-handed batsman who bowled right-arm fast-medium.

He was born in Parkstone, Dorset and educated at Radley College and Pembroke College, Cambridge.

Cornwell made his debut for Dorset in the 1947 Minor Counties Championship against Wiltshire.  He played 2 further Minor Counties Championship matches in 1950, against Berkshire and Oxfordshire. He made a single first-class match for the Free Foresters against Oxford University in 1949. In this match he was dismissed for a duck twice, by George Chesterton in the Free Foresters first-innings, and by future South Africa Test player Clive van Ryneveld in their second.  He took 3 wickets in the match, all coming in the Oxford University first-innings for the cost of 60 runs from 16 overs.

He later worked as an advertising executive, including as creative director for a New York firm, and lived in the Seattle metropolitan area at Lynnwood, Washington, United States, where he died.

He was the elder brother of David Cornwell, known as the writer John le Carré, and the elder half-brother of the journalist Rupert Cornwell and the actress Charlotte Cornwell.

References

External links

1929 births
2017 deaths
People from Parkstone
Cricketers from Dorset
People educated at Radley College
Alumni of Pembroke College, Cambridge
English cricketers
Dorset cricketers
Free Foresters cricketers